Duke Xiao may refer to these rulers from ancient China:

Duke Xiao of Chen ( 10th century BC)
Duke Xiao of Qi (died 633 BC)
Duke Xiao of Qin (381–338 BC)